Vitry-sur-Seine is a station in Paris's express suburban rail system, the RER. It is on the Paris–Bordeaux railway. It serves the commune of Vitry-sur-Seine, in the Val-de-Marne department.

See also
 List of stations of the Paris RER

External links

 

Railway stations in France opened in 1840
Réseau Express Régional stations
Railway stations in Val-de-Marne